Qabed (also Romanized as Qobeyd) is a village in Rivand Rural District, in the Central District of Nishapur County, Razavi Khorasan Province, Iran. At the 2006 census, its population was 54, in 20 families.

References 

Populated places in Nishapur County